Timeless is the debut studio album by British electronic musician Goldie. It was released on 31 July 1995 and is universally regarded as a groundbreaking release in the history of drum and bass music. The album blended the complex, chopped and layered breakbeats and deep basslines of jungle and drum and bass with expansive, symphonic strings and atmospherics, and female vocals.

History
Goldie was joined in the studio by engineer/producer Rob Playford (founder of the Moving Shadow label), who did most of the programming and production, with Goldie generating the musical ideas, rhythms and arrangements. Additional engineering and production came from Dego and Marc Mac of 4hero. Diane Charlemagne contributed the bulk of the vocals. Its title track includes what has become the most recognisable and crossover hit from the album, "Inner City Life". Tracks such as "Angel", "You & Me" and "Kemistry" (dedicated to DJ Kemistry) appeared in remastered form from their original 1992/93 versions.

Released on Pete Tong's FFRR label, the album reached no. 7 on the UK Albums Chart. Timeless was simultaneously released as a double album and single album. The single album removed four tracks and featured the original mix of "Sensual". The US release of the double album appended two bonus remixes.

Reception

It is listed as one of the best albums of all time in the book 1001 Albums You Must Hear Before You Die.

Spin (12/95, p. 63) – Ranked No. 17 on Spin's list of the `20 Best Albums Of '95.'
Spin (12/95, p.81) – 9 – Near Perfect – "A fall of light into the urban endzone... Goldie has taken jungle to a more expansive level here, fusing its ominous bad-boy polyrhythms with gorgeous diva vocals, rich piano playing, and upbeat jazzy chords that dissolve into ambient clouds...brings jungle to a new level of cross-fertilization..."
Alternative Press (1/96, p. 80) – "Starting with the increasingly familiar... palette of jungle/drum and bass music, Goldie and his Metalheadz sculpt expansive sonic constructions that elude the linear confines of descriptive language."
Melody Maker (12/23-30/95, pp. 66–67) – Ranked No. 8 on Melody Maker's list of 1995's 'Albums of the Year' – "The jungle underground's figurehead... Massive and jaw-droppingly ambitious."
Village Voice (2/20/96) – Ranked No. 23 in Village Voice's 1995 Pazz & Jop Critics' Poll.
New York Times (1/6/96, p. C16) – Included in Neil Strauss' list of the Top 10 Albums of `95 – "The frenetic break beats of Great Britain's jungle dance-music rub against lush ambient music, live instruments and a technology-addled sense of soul..."
NME (12/23–30/95, pp. 22–23) – Ranked No. 10 in NME's `Top 50 Albums of the Year' for 1995 – "An astonishing...symphony of whizzing breakbeats, fluid soundscapes and mind-warping moodswings..."
The Guardian – Described the release of the album as one of the "50 key events in the history of dance music" in 2011.

Track listing
2×CD edition

CD/cassette edition

The cassette release is identical to the single CD release, with three songs on the first side and five on the second side.

2×LP/vinyl edition

Charts

References

External links
 

1995 debut albums
Goldie albums